Claudia Doumit is an Australian actress. She portrayed Jiya Marri in the NBC series Timeless and is best known for her portrayal of Farah Karim from Call of Duty: Modern Warfare and Victoria Neuman from the Amazon Prime Video original series The Boys.

Early life and education
Claudia Doumit was born on May 2, 1992 in Sydney, Australia. She is of Italian and Lebanese ancestry. She has one older brother named James.

Doumit studied at the Actors College of Theatre and Television (ACTT) and The Actors Centre Australia. Although she was rejected from National Institute of Dramatic Art (NIDA)  in Kensington, Australia, she did attend a couple of classes. She also took a two-year intensive program with the Stella Adler Academy of Acting in Los Angeles.

Career
In 2016, Doumit began playing the role of Jiya Marri in the NBC series Timeless. The series concluded in 2018.

On 5 September 2019, it was announced that Doumit was cast as Victoria Neuman in the second season of the Amazon superhero series The Boys, reuniting her with fellow Timeless alums Goran Višnjić and Malcolm Barrett and showrunner Eric Kripke.

Doumit also appeared in the 2019 video game Call of Duty: Modern Warfare, where she voiced and portrayed Farah Karim.

Filmography

Film

Television

Online

Video games

References

External links
 
 Claudia Doumit on Twitter

21st-century American actresses
American film actresses
Australian film actresses
Australian people of Italian descent
Australian people of Lebanese descent
Australian people of Arab descent
Australian video game actresses
Living people
1992 births